Vernole is a town and comune in the Italian province of Lecce in the Apulia region of south-east Italy.

The commune includes the village of Acaya, a fortified village with a castle.

References

Localities of Salento